A Divina Comédia ou Ando Meio Desligado is the third album by the Brazilian rock band Os Mutantes. The album was originally released in 1970 (see 1970 in music) and reissued in 1999 on Omplatten Records and again in 2006 by Omplatten's (and Polydor's) parent company, Universal Records.  The title in English means: The Divine Comedy or I Am a Bit Disconnected.  "I am a bit disconnected" in this sense means "I feel a little spaced out."  The second track features the band imitating California accents.  The album as a whole is characterized by a mix of psychedelic and religious imagery.

It's also the first album by the band to break away from the Tropicália aesthetic, and move towards more of a pure rock sound. Except for a tongue-in-cheek version of the ballad "Chão de Estrelas", the record shows little Brazilian music influence. This shift in direction is speculated to be because their helpers and influences, Tropicalismo stars Caetano Veloso and Gilberto Gil were exiled by the Brazilian military dictatorship.

The album cover reflects a similar illustration by Gustav Doré from Dante's Divine Comedy.

It was listed by Rolling Stone Brazil at #22 in the list of 100 best Brazilian albums in history. The magazine also elected the title song "Ando Meio Desligado" as the 50th greatest Brazilian song.

Track listing

Personnel
Os Mutantes
 Arnaldo Baptista: vocals (tracks 2, 3, 5, 7, 8, 9, 10, 11), keyboards and bass
 Rita Lee: vocals (tracks 1, 2, 3, 5, 6, 7, 9, 10), percussion, theremin, autoharp, recorder
 Sérgio Dias: vocals (tracks 1, 2, 3, 4, 7, 9, 10), guitars

with:
 Rogério Duprat: orchestral arrangements
 Liminha: bass (tracks 2, 4, 6, 7)
 Dinho Leme: drums
 Raphael Villardi: acoustic guitar (tracks 3, 8) and vocals (track 3)
 Naná Vasconcelos: percussion (tracks 1, 4)

References

1970 albums
Os Mutantes albums
Polydor Records albums
Música Popular Brasileira albums
Portuguese-language albums